Leopold Wahlstedt (born 4 July 1999) is a Swedish professional footballer who plays as a goalkeeper for Odds BK.

Club career 
Wahlstedt joined Odd from Arendal ahead of the 2021 season. On 12 September 2021, he made his Eliteserien debut for the club in a 1–1 draw against Bodø/Glimt.

International career 
In September 2022 Wahlstedt received his first call-up to the Swedish national team. He made his full international for debut Sweden on 9 January 2023, playing for 90 minutes in a friendly 2–0 win against Finland.

Personal life 
Wahlstedt's paternal grandfather is from Sicily, Italy.

Career statistics

International

References

1999 births
Living people
Footballers from Stockholm
Swedish footballers
Association football goalkeepers
Sweden international footballers
Sweden youth international footballers
Dalkurd FF players
Arendal Fotball players
Odds BK players
Norwegian Second Division players
Eliteserien players
Swedish expatriate footballers
Swedish expatriate sportspeople in Norway
Expatriate footballers in Norway